James Voss may refer to:

 James S. Voss (born 1949), United States Army officer and NASA astronaut
 James Voss (rugby union) (born 1994), English rugby union player
 James L. Voss (1934–2013), American veterinarian and equine specialist
 James W. Voss, American nuclear engineer